The Visconti Castle of Legnano is a mediaeval castle, located south of the city of Legnano, Metropolitan City of Milan, Lombardy, northern Italy. It lies on a small island formed by the Olona river. Since the 13th century, it is also known as the castle of San Giorgio.

In the form visible today, it is the result of several construction phases, under the property of different noble families, and subsequent partial destructions.

History
The castle's origin is connected to a tower house belonging to the Visconti family and dating back at least to the 13th century. It was taken by the Della Torre around 1270, during the period of the conflict between the factions supporting the two families. To consolidate their position in the Legnano area, the Della Torre enlarged the tower house.

After the defeat of the Della Torre, the fortification passed again to the Visconti. In the 15th century, the Duke of Milan Filippo Maria Visconti granted the castle to Oldrado II Lampugnani. He intervened on the castle, adding to the old building a larger external enclosure with an entrance tower and six semi-cylindrical turrets. The construction material was the bricks, commonly used in the Visconti castles of the flat regions under their rule. However, the semi-cylindrical turrets make it different from that type. A large moat surrounded the castle. A drawbridge over the ditch conducted to the gate of the entrance tower.

During the following centuries, the castles decayed, the vegetation attacked and partially compromised the building. Two of the semi-cylindrical towers (those on the southern side) went lost.

In the 20th century, the Municipality of Legnano, owner of the castle, secured and restored it.

Today
After its restoration, the Municipality of Legnano opened the castle to the public. Around it, the Parco del Castello, a public park, was created on the island and the area near the Olona river. The moat is devoid of water.

Since 2008, the castle and its park have been included in the wider Parco dei Mulini extended to other municipalities along the Olona river.

References

Sources

External links
 Lombardia Beni Culturali – Castello di S. Giorgio, Legnano (MI)
 Città di Legnano - Parco Castello
 Parco dei Mulini - Official site

Castles in Lombardy
Legnano